{{Infobox surname
| name = Pérez, Perez
| image =
| caption = <small>Pérez shield</small>
| meaning = Son of Pero or Pedro (Peter) /  To breach or to burst forth
| region = Spain, Israel
| language = Spanish, Hebrew
| variant = Fares, Farez, Fretz, Peres, Peris, Peretz, Pesidas, Pharez, Pretz, Pritz, Peters
| pronunciation=  /   
}}Pérez, or Perez' as most commonly written in English, is a Castilian Spanish surname. Perez (pronounced Peretz, see below) is also common in people of Sephardic Jewish descent and is the 4th most common surname in Israel, most common surname not of Hebrew origin and most common surname exclusive to a single Jewish ethnic division.

Origins
The surname has a Portuguese counterpart with the same meaning and etymology, Peres, written with a final "s" instead of "z" and without the accent.

The surname with a Hebrew origin is transliterated into English as either Perez or Peretz, and is derived from the Hebrew given name פרץ (cf. ), after the biblical character Perez (son of Judah), which in Hebrew means "to breach" or "to burst forth". That biblical character's Hebrew name, however, is transliterated as Farés in the Spanish Christian Bible.

Neither the Spanish nor the Hebrew surname corresponds to one single lineage. Instead, both correspond to many unrelated lineages.

Additionally, while the Spanish and Hebrew etymological origins are distinct, there are nevertheless those who carry the surname because, in their particular case, the origin of their surname is Spanish Jewish (i.e. Sephardic), and they, as Spanish Jews or their descendants, adopted the surname precisely because of its ambiguity.

Pérez as a surname among Spanish Jews or their descendants could be considered by their non-Jewish Spanish or Hispanic neighbors a typical Christian surname, yet still pay homage to their Jewish roots. This was helpful during the times of the Spanish Inquisition and its persecution of the Jews (and their baptized New Christian descendants) in Spain and its colonies in Hispanic America.

Among Spaniards and Hispanics, the surname by itself does not necessarily indicate a Jewish heritage. Likewise, among Jews, the surname does not by itself necessarily indicate a Sephardic heritage.

Pronunciation
In Castilian Spanish, the name is pronounced  and in Hispanic America, . The accent or stress is placed on the second-to-last syllable. In British English, on the contrary, it is usually pronounced with stress on the last syllable.

In Modern Hebrew the name is written פרץ and pronounced .

List of persons with the surname

 Adolfo Pérez Esquivel, Argentine activist
 Agustin Pérez (died 1286), Roman Catholic bishop
 Ailyn Pérez, American opera singer
 AJ Perez (1993–2011), Filipino actor
 AJ Perez (blogger), Filipino blogger
 Al Perez, American professional wrestler
 Albino Pérez, Mexican soldier and politician
 Álex Pérez (footballer, born 1991), Spanish footballer
 Alfonso Pérez, Colombian boxer
 Alfredo Pérez, Venezuelan boxer
 Alonso Pérez, Spanish painter
 Amalia Pérez (born 1977), Mexican powerlifter
 Amalia Pérez Díaz, Venezuelan actress
 Amanda Perez, American R&B/Hip-Hop artist
 Amy Perez, Filipino actress
 Ángel Pérez (volleyball), Puerto Rican volleyball player
 Antonio Pérez, Spanish statesman, secretary to King Philip II
 Antonio Pérez, Dominican baseball player
 Antonio Pérez Delgadillo, Mexican football goalkeeper
 Pitbull (born Armando Pérez), American rapper
 Arnaldo Pérez, Puerto Rican swimmer
 Arturo Pérez-Reverte, Spanish novelist and journalist
 Ashley Grace Pérez, American Latin pop singer, member of pop group Ha*Ash
 Ayoze Pérez (born 1993), Spanish footballer
 Bartolomé Pérez (1634–1693), Spanish painter
 Belle Perez, Belgian musician and songwriter
 Benito Pérez Galdós, Spanish novelist
 Bianca Jagger, born Bianca Pérez-Mora, Nicaraguan social and human rights advocate
 Blanca Delia Pérez, Canary Islands politician
 Calixto Pérez, Colombian boxer
 Carlos Pérez, Dominican baseball player
 Carlos Pérez (catcher) (born 1990), Venezuelan baseball player
 Carlos Pérez (kayaker), Spanish kayaker
 Carlos Pérez de Bricio (1927–2022), Spanish businessman
 Carlos Andrés Pérez (1922–2010), President of Venezuela
 Carlota Pérez, Venezuelan economist
 Carmen Victoria Pérez, Venezuelan model
 Chris Pérez (born 1969), American guitarist
 Chris Perez (baseball) (born 1985), American baseball player
 Chris Perez (gridiron football) (born 1969), American player of gridiron football
 Christian Perez (footballer born 1963), French soccer player
 Cionel Pérez (born 1996), Cuban baseball player
 Clara Perez, Venezuelan actress
 Cristina Pérez (judge), American judge, host of Corte de Familia Cristina Pérez (reporter), Argentine television news journalist
 Cynthia Adam Pérez, Shrek Stan
 Dámaso Pérez Prado, Cuban composer
 Danilo Pérez, Panamian pianist and composer
, Venezuelan painter
 Davide Perez, Italian composer
 Diego Pérez (footballer), Uruguayan footballer
 Diego Pérez (tennis), Uruguayan tennis player
 Eddie Perez (politician), American politician
 Eduardo Perez, Venezuelan baseball player
 Eduardo Pérez, American baseball player
 Eduardo Pérez Gonsalves, Spanish chess master
 Efrén Pérez Rivera, Puerto Rican environmentalist
, Venezuelan cultural promoter, critic, writer, film producer
 Elizabeth Pérez, Venezuelan television journalist
 Emilio Pérez Touriño, Spanish politician
 Emily Perez, American soldier, first female minority Command Sergeant at West Point
 Enrique López Pérez, Spanish tennis player
 Érik Pérez, Mexican mixed martial artist
 Esteban Pérez, Argentine basketball player
 Felipe Pérez Roque, Cuban politician, current foreign minister of the Republic of Cuba
 Félix Javier Pérez, Puerto Rican basketball player
 Fruto Chamorro Pérez, Nicaraguan military scientist and politician
 Florentino Pérez, Spanish businessman
 Francisco Pérez (baseball) (born 1997), Dominican baseball player
 Francisco Pérez Sierra, Spanish painter
 George Pérez, Puerto Rican-American illustrator and writer of comic books
 Glória Perez, Brazilian screenwriter
 Gloria Osuna Perez, American artist
, American Latin pop singer, member of pop group Ha*Ash
 Héctor Amodio Pérez, Uruguayan guerrilla fighter
 Hernán Pérez, Venezuelan baseball player
 Henrique Pérez Dupuy, Venezuelan banker
 Hugo Pérez (soccer) (born 1963), American international soccer player
 Hugo Pérez (footballer) (born 1968), Argentine international soccer player
, Venezuelan engineer
 Ibán Pérez, Spanish volleyball player
, Venezuelan entrepreneur
 Iván Pérez, Cuban-born Spanish water polo player
 JA Pérez (theologian), Cuban author, theologian and humanitarian
 Jairo Pérez (cyclist), Colombian track and road cyclist
 Jairo Pérez (footballer), Colombian footballer
 Javier Pérez de Cuéllar, Peruvian diplomat, the fifth Secretary-General of the United Nations
 Jean-Claude Perez (born 1964), French politician
 Jefferson Pérez, Ecuadorian track and field athlete
 Jérôme Pérez, French soccer player
 Jesús Pérez (boxer) (born 1971), Colombian boxer
 Jesús Pérez (cyclist) (born 1984), Venezuelan road cyclist
 Joe Perez (baseball) (born 1999), American baseball player
 Johan Pérez, Venezuelan boxer
 Jorge M. Pérez, Cuban American real estate developer
 Jose Perez (American football) (born 1985), American football player and former baseball player
 José Pérez (athlete), (born 1971), Cuban hurdler
 José Pérez (fencer) (born 1958), Spanish Olympic fencer
 José Pérez (pentathlete) (born 1928), Mexican Olympic modern pentathlete and fencer
 José Pérez (Venezuelan boxer) (born 1964), former Venezuelan boxer
 José Pérez Adán (born 1952), Spanish sociologist
 José Pérez Ferrada (born 1985), Chilean footballer
 José Pérez Francés (1936–2021), Spanish road racing cyclist
 José Pérez Reyes (born 1975), boxer from the Dominican Republic
 José Pérez Rosa, Puerto Rican senator and politician
 José Joaquín Pérez (1801–1889), Chilean political figure
 José Luis Pérez (equestrian) (born 1943), Mexican equestrian
 José María Pérez de Urdininea (1784–1865), president of Bolivia
 José Miguel Pérez (fencer) (born 1938), Puerto Rican fencer
 José Miguel Pérez (triathlete) (born 1986), Spanish triathlete
 José Ricardo Pérez (born 1963), Colombian football defender
 Joseph Pérez, French historian specializing in Spanish history
 Juan Bautista Pérez, President of Venezuela
 Juan José Pérez Hernández, Spanish explorer
 Juan Silvano Diaz Perez (1914–1969), Paraguayan chess master, poet, teacher, essayist and literary critic.
 Juan Pablo Pérez Alfonzo, Venezuelan diplomat, politician
 Julia Perez, Indonesian actress
Julia Pérez, later Marina Baura, Venezuelan actress
 Karlee Pérez, ring name "Maxine", American professional wrestler, manager and authority figure
 Kenda Perez (born 1983), American model and host
 Kenneth Perez, Danish football player
 Kevin Perez, also known as Kay Flock, American rapper
 Leander Perez, Louisiana judge
 Louie Pérez (born 1953), American songwriter, percussionist and guitarist
 Lucas Pérez (born 1988), Spanish footballer
 Lucas Pérez Godoy (born 1993), Argentine footballer
 Luis Perez (American football) (born 1994), American football player
 Luis Pérez-Oramas (born 1960), Venezuelan poet, art historian and curator
 Luis Pérez-Sala (born 1959), Spanish race car driver.
 Luis Alberto Pérez-Rionda, Cuban sprinter
 Luis Eladio Pérez, Colombian politician
 Luis Ernesto Pérez, Mexican footballer
 Luisana Pérez, Venezuelan journalist
 Luisana Pérez, Venezuelan table tennis player
 Manuel Perez (animator) (1914–1981), American animator
 Manuel Pérez (boxer) (born 1984), Mexican-American boxer
 Manuel Pérez (guerrilla leader) (died 1988), leader of the Colombian National Liberation Army from the 1970s to 1998
 Manuel Perez (musician) (1871–1946), American cornetist and bandleader
 Manuel Pérez (President of Nicaragua) (died 1852), President of Nicaragua 1843–1844
 Manuel Pérez (teacher) (1890–1951), Puerto Rican teacher and public servant
 Manuel Perez, Jr. (1923–1945), American soldier and Medal of Honor recipient
 V. Manuel Perez (born 1973), California State Assemblyman, 80th District
 Manuel Pérez Brunicardi (born 1978), Spanish ski mountaineer
 Manuel Pérez Flores (born 1980), Mexican footballer
, Venezuelan politician
 Marcos Pérez Jiménez, President of Venezuela 1952–1958
 María Dolores Pérez Enciso, Spanish-born Mexican writer and journalist
 María Luisa Pérez Herrero (1898–1934), Spanish painter
 Mariano Ospina Pérez, President of Colombia 1946–1950
 Mariela Pérez Branger, Venezuelan model
 Marina Pérez, Spanish fashion model
 Mario Pérez Saldivar, Mexican long-distance runner
 Mario Pérez Zúñiga, Mexican footballer
 Martín Pérez (baseball), Venezuelan baseball player
 Mélido Pérez, Dominican Republic baseball player
 Melina Perez, American professional wrestler
 Mercedes Pérez, Colombian weightlifter
 Mercedes Pérez Merino (born 1960), Spanish trade unionist and politician
 Michael Pérez (born 1992), Puerto Rican baseball player
 Miguel Perez (disambiguation), several people
 Millie Pérez de Francia, Puerto Rican Educator, Distance Education Specialist.
 Montse Pérez, Catalan actress
 Narcisa Pérez Reoyo (1849–1876), Spanish writer
 Neifi Pérez, Dominican Republic baseball player
, Venezuelan lawyer
 Odalis Pérez, Dominican Republic baseball player
 Óliver Pérez, Mexican baseball player
 Orlando Perez, American soccer player
 Óscar Pérez Bovela, Spanish football player
 Óscar Pérez Rojas, Mexican football player
 Otto Pérez Molina, Guatemalan politician, retired military and the President of Guatemala
 Pablo Pérez Álvarez, Venezuelan lawyer, politician and former Governor of Zulia State
 Pascual Pérez (boxer), Argentine flyweight
 Patricia Pérez (footballer), Mexican female footballer
 Patricia Pérez (born 2004), Spanish rhythmic gymnast 
 Pedro Pérez, Cuban triple jumper
 Rafael Pérez (baseball), Mexican baseball player
 Rafael Pérez Pareja (1836–1897), president of Ecuador
 Ricardo Pérez Godoy, Peruvian politician, President of the Military Junta
 Richard Ray Perez, American film producer and director
 Robert Pérez (baseball) (born 1969), Venezuelan baseball player
 Robert Pérez Palou, Spanish painter
 Roberto Pérez (born 1988), Puerto Rican baseball player
 Rodolfo Pérez (field hockey), Argentine field hockey player
 Rolando Perez, American mixed martial artist
 Romina Pérez (born 1958), Bolivian politician
 Rosie Perez, American actress, dancer, choreographer and director
 Rudy Pérez, Cuban-American composer and producer
 Salvador Pérez, Venezuelan baseball player
 Sara Pérez (disambiguation)
 Sébastien Pérez, French soccer player
 Sergio Pérez, Mexican F1 driver
 Silverio Pérez, Puerto Rican entertainer
 Silverio Pérez (bullfighter), Mexican bullfighter
 Thomas Perez, United States Secretary of Labor
 Tomás Pérez, Venezuelan baseball player
 Tony Pérez, Cuban-American baseball player
, Venezuelan poet and writer
 Vicente Pérez Rosales, Chilean colonization agent
 Victor Perez, Tunisian Jewish world champion flyweight boxer
 Victor Perez, French professional golfer
 Vincent Pérez, Swiss actor
 Wilson Pérez, Colombian football defender
 Williams Pérez, Venezuelan baseball player
 Yolanda Pérez, Mexican-American singer who specializes in banda music
 Yorkis Pérez, Dominican Republic baseball player]
 Giovanni Perez, philosopher, writer, editor from Verona, Italy.

Fictional characters with the surname
 D.I. Jimmy Pérez, Shetland (TV series)
Alfonsín Pérez, Sune
 Maria Pérez, Sune
 Maddy Perez Euphoria (American TV series)
 Eduardo Pérez, Despicable Me 2
 Antonio Pérez, Despicable Me 2
 Augustine Perez, Call of Duty: WWII 

See also
 Peiris
 Perez (given name)
 Perez.'', an Italian neo-noir film

References

Patronymic surnames
Spanish-language surnames
Jewish surnames
Sephardic surnames
Surnames from given names
Surnames of Honduran origin
Surnames of Salvadoran origin
Surnames of Guatemalan origin
Surnames of Colombian origin
Surnames of Uruguayan origin
it:Perez